Kalamunda bus station is a Transperth bus station located next to the Kalamunda Central shopping centre in Kalamunda, Western Australia. It has four stands and is served by eight Transperth routes operated by Path Transit and Swan Transit.

Kalamunda bus station opened in September 1982.

In 2009, the bus station was redeveloped with more modern bus shelters, new stands, full accessibility, improved lighting and better signage.

Bus routes

References

Bus stations in Perth, Western Australia
Kalamunda, Western Australia